Dil Ki Baat is a music album released by Pakistani pop singer, Junaid Jamshed Khan. It contained some hits that were re-released for the UK. The song Tum Kehti Ho was later used in serial Zindagi Gulzar Hai on Hum TV.

Track listing
"Tum Kehti Ho"
"Aankhon Ka"
"Aao Aaj Phir"
"Aashnaa"
"Dil Ki Baat"
"Hone Ko Hai"
"Intezaar"
"Kaho Na"
"Sanwala"
"Janaa"
"Na Tu Aayegee" (UK Version)
"Gori Funky Mix" (UK Version)
"Yaar"

Junaid Jamshed albums
2001 albums